An election to Staffordshire County Council took place on 2 May 2013 as part of the 2013 United Kingdom local elections. 62 electoral divisions returned one county councillor each by first-past-the-post voting for a four-year term of office. Following a boundary review, new electoral division boundaries were established for this election. No elections were held in Stoke-on-Trent, which is a unitary authority outside the area covered by the County Council. The council continues to be administered on the Leader and Cabinet model.

All locally registered electors (British, Irish, Commonwealth and European Union citizens) who were aged 18 or over on Thursday 2 May 2013 were entitled to vote in the local elections. Those who were temporarily away from their ordinary address (for example, away working, on holiday, in student accommodation or in hospital) were also entitled to vote in the local elections, although those who had moved abroad and registered as overseas electors cannot vote in the local elections. It is possible to register to vote at more than one address (such as a university student who had a term-time address and lives at home during holidays) at the discretion of the local Electoral Register Office, but it remains an offence to vote more than once in the same local government election.

Summary
The election was won by the Conservative Party with 34 seats, despite the loss of 15 seats resulting in a narrow majority of just two councillors. Labour won 24 seats, a net gain of 21.  All four Liberal Democrats lost their seats, in each case to a Labour candidate. Despite an increase in share of the vote across the county to 24%, the number of UKIP councillors elected bucked the national trend with a net loss of two seats. 
Two independent candidates won seats, with one holding the Caverswall division and the other gaining a seat from the Conservative Party.

Results

|}

Notes

References

Staffordshire
2013
2010s in Staffordshire